Pratap Narayan Mishra (24 September 1856 – 6 July 1894) was a Hindi essayist in British India. He is famous for exhorting all Indians to chant and believe in "Hindi, Hindu, Hindustan".

His famous literary works were Bharat Durdasha, Lokokti Shatak, Shriprem Puran, Prarthana Shatak, Kaut', Trupantam, Hathi Hammir, Braidala Swagat and Kanpur Mahamatya''.

References

1856 births
1894 deaths
19th-century Indian essayists
Hindi-language writers